Kassim Ouma (born 12 December 1978) is a Ugandan professional boxer. He held the IBF junior middleweight title from 2004 to 2005, and has challenged twice for a world middleweight title in 2006 and 2011.

Early life
Born into poverty, at the age of six he was kidnapped and forced to join the National Resistance Army and consequently did not see his family for five years. Ouma is the 7th of 13 children, which include 7 brothers and 5 sisters. Only 4 brothers are still alive.

Amateur career
Upon leaving the army, Ouma started boxing and amassed an amateur record of 62 wins and 3 losses. He made the Ugandan national boxing team and was selected to fight at the 1996 Summer Olympics in Atlanta, Georgia, but did not attend due to financial difficulties.

Professional career
On a Ugandan national amateur team trip to the United States, Ouma decided to stay to undertake a career as a professional boxer to support his family in Uganda. Ouma later won the International Boxing Federation (IBF) Junior Middleweight world title.

Ouma is a former champion and top-level contender in the Light Middleweight division. He has quality wins against Jason Papillion, Juan Carlos Candelo, and Verno Phillips, his second win against whom earned him the IBF Light Middleweight title. Ouma successfully defended his championship with a twelve-round unanimous decision against Kofi Jantuah of Ghana. Ouma later lost this title in a unanimous decision defeat against Roman Karmazin, a bout in which Ouma was put to the canvas twice. It was only the second defeat of his career.

Since the Karmazin bout, Ouma has remained active in the Light Middleweight division, earning three wins, two by knockout. On May 6, 2006 Ouma defeated Marco Antonio Rubio by split decision despite being knocked down in the first round.

Ouma returned to the ring with an impressive win over undefeated fellow southpaw Sechew Powell August 5, 2006. Powell is from Brooklyn, NY and the fight took place at the Theatre of Madison Square Garden. The official scorecards were 90-100, 93-97, and 94-96 all in favor of Kassim Ouma by unanimous decision.

Ouma lost the middleweight title shot against Jermain Taylor on Dec. 9, 2006. Taylor's power and well-timed clenches kept Ouma from throwing as many punches as he usually does.  Despite absorbing a large number of extremely hard shots, Ouma did not go down.  The fight went the full 12 rounds, and Ouma lost by unanimous decision.  The judges scored the fight 118-110, 117-111 and 115-113 for Taylor who was at home in Little Rock, Arkansas.

After the Taylor fight Ouma lost back to back close decisions to Saul Roman in October 2007 and Cornelius Bundrage in March 2008.

On September 25, 2010, Ouma stopped Joey Gilbert in the 6th round of their 10-round bout for the vacant NABA middleweight title at the Grand Sierra Resort in Reno, Nevada.

Personal life
While in Uganda he was never shot despite being in the army. However, after having moved to America he was shot twice in Florida in December 2002. According to Ouma, his father was beaten to death by the Ugandan army in retaliation for his leaving of the country. A documentary entitled Kassim the Dream was made in 2008. It was an official selection at several film festivals.

See also
List of kidnappings
List of solved missing person cases

Professional boxing record

References

External links

1978 births
1980s missing person cases
Formerly missing people
International Boxing Federation champions
Light-middleweight boxers
Living people
Kidnapped Ugandan people
Middleweight boxers
Missing person cases in Uganda
Sportspeople from Kampala
Ugandan emigrants to the United States
Ugandan male boxers
World middleweight boxing champions